The surname Finn has several origins. In some cases it is derived from the Irish Ó Finn, meaning "descendant of Fionn"; the byname means "white" or "fair-haired". In other cases it is derived from the Old Norse Finnr, a personal name sometimes derived from a byname, or else from compound names beginning with this word element. In other cases Finn is a German surname derived from an ethnic name referring to people from Finland. Notable people sharing the surname are listed below.

Academics
 Chester E. Finn Jr. (born 1944) American professor of education, policy analyst and US Assistant Secretary of Education
 Frank Finn (1868–1932), English ornithologist
 Jeremy Finn, American psychologist
 Robert Finn (mathematician) (1922–2022), American mathematician
 Ronald Finn (1930–2004), English medical researcher

Arts and entertainment
 Alec Finn (1944–2018), British-born musician
 Charlie Finn (born 1981), American actor and voice actor
 Chris Finn, Canadian stand-up comedian and writer
 Christine Finn (1929/30–2007), English actress
 Craig Finn (born 1971), American musician
 Henry J. Finn (1787–1840), American actor and writer
 Jason Finn (musician) (born 1967), American musician
 Jeffrey Finn (born 1970), American theatrical producer
 Jerry Finn (1969–2008), American record producer
 John Finn (born 1952), American actor
 Jon Finn (born 1958), American musician and guitarist
 Liam Finn (born 1983), Australian-New Zealand musician
 Mali Finn (1938–2007), American Hollywood casting director and drama teacher
 Mark Finn (born 1969), American fantasy and science fiction writer
 Mickey Finn (drummer) (1947–2003), English percussionist
 Mickey Finn (guitarist) (1947–2013), British rock guitarist
 Mickey Finn (Irish fiddler) (1951–1987), Irish fiddler
 Neil Finn (born 1958), New Zealand singer-songwriter
 Pat Finn (game show host) (born 1956), American television presenter, game show host and entrepreneur
 Pat Finn (actor) (born 1965), American actor
 Paul Anthony Finn, Irish singer-songwriter, member of the 2000s indie rock quartet The Flaws
 Sean Finn (DJ), German DJ and electronic musician
 Simon Finn (musician) (born 1951), English musician
 Terry Finn (born 1955), American actor
 Tim Finn (born 1952), New Zealand singer-songwriter
 Tom Finn, American musician, a founding member of the 1960s pop group The Left Banke
 Veronica Finn (born 1981), American singer
 Will Finn (born 1958), American animator, voice actor and director
 William Finn (born 1952), American composer and lyricist

Business and politics
 Bernie Finn (born 1961), Australian politician
 Daniel E. Finn Sr. (1845–1910), American politician, lawyer and judge
 David Finn (1921–2021), American public relations executive, photographer, and historian of sculpture.
 Gilbert Finn (born 1920), Canadian businessman and politician
 Howard Finn (1917–1986), American politician
 James Finn (1806–1872), British Consul in Jerusalem
 Elizabeth Anne Finn; wife of the above, James Finn
 Robert Finn (diplomat) (born 1945), former American ambassador to Afghanistan
 Robert Emmett Finn (1877–1951), Canadian lawyer and politician
 Simon Finn (politician) (born 1965), Australian politician
 Skip Finn (1948–2018), American politician
 Ted Finn (c. 1930–2007), Canadian lawyer and government official; first director of the Canadian Security Intelligence Service (CSIS)
 Walter L. Finn (1875–1936), American physician and politician
 William Francis Finn (1784–1862),Irish politician

Military
 James Fynn (1893–1917), English recipient of the Victoria Cross
 John William Finn (1909–2010), American naval officer and recipient of the Medal of Honor
 Mickey Finn (inventor) (1938–2007), American inventor and designer of military weapons systems
 Sean C. Finn (1889–1921), Irish Republican Army commander

Religion
 Francis J. Finn (1859–1928), American Catholic priest and author
 Richard Finn (born 1963), English priest, academic and theologian
 Robert Finn (bishop) (born 1953), American Roman Catholic prelate, former bishop of Kansas City, Missouri

Sports
 Charles Finn (water polo) (1899–1974), American Olympic water polo player
 Danny Finn (born 1987), Candlepin Bowler
 Hubert Finn (1900-1952), Australian rugby league footballer and physician
 Jim Finn (born 1976), American professional football player
 Jimmy Finn (born 1931), Irish hurler
 Kenny Finn, Irish-American soccer and Gaelic football player
 Micky Finn (footballer) (born 1954), English footballer
 Mike Finn (born 1981), Irish Australian rules footballer and basketball player
 Ron Finn (born 1940), Canadian ice hockey linesman
 Sean Finn (footballer) (born 1978), Irish retired footballer
 Steven Finn (born 1989), English cricketer
 Steven Finn (ice hockey) (born 1966), Canadian hockey player
 Tommy Finn, rugby league footballer who played in the 1950s and 1960s

Other
 Alfred C. Finn (1883–1964), American architect
 Camila Finn (born 1991), Brazilian fashion model
 Edmund Finn (1819–1898), Australian journalist and author
 Shirley Finn (1941–1975), Australian brothel owner who was murdered

See also
Henri Fin (born 1950), French cyclist

English-language surnames
Germanic-language surnames
Surnames of Irish origin
Scottish surnames
Ethnonymic surnames
Surnames from given names

de:Finn